Lake of the Ozarks is a reservoir created by impounding the Osage River in the northern part of the Ozarks in central Missouri. Parts of three smaller tributaries to the Osage are included in the impoundment - the Niangua River, Grandglaize Creek, and Gravois Creek. The main channel of the Osage Arm stretches  from one end to the other. The lake's serpentine shape has earned it the nickname "the Missouri Dragon", which has, in turn, inspired the names of local institutions such as the Magic Dragon Street Meet.

History

A hydroelectric power plant on the Osage River was first pursued by Kansas City developer Ralph Street in 1912. He put together the initial funding and began building roads, railroads, and infrastructure necessary to begin construction of a dam, with a plan to impound a much smaller lake. In the mid-1920s, Street's funding dried up, and he abandoned the effort.

The lake was created by the construction of the 2,543-foot-long (775 m) Bagnell Dam by the Union Electric Company of St. Louis, Missouri. The principal engineering firm was Stone and Webster. Construction began August 8, 1929, and was completed in April 1931; the lake reached spillway elevation on May 20, 1931. Looking closely, the map of the lake is shaped somewhat like a dragon.

During construction, the lake was referred to as Osage Reservoir or Lake Osage. The Missouri General Assembly officially named it Lake Benton after Senator Thomas Hart Benton. None of the names stuck, as it was popularly referred to by its location at the northern edge of the Ozarks. The electric generating station, however, is still referred to by the utility company as the Osage Hydroelectric Plant.

While some sources indicate that more than 20 towns, villages, and settlements were permanently flooded to create the lake, the actual number was closer to eight. Several other settlements had been previously abandoned, were relocated to make way for the lake, or were on high enough ground that the creation of the lake did not affect them.

At the time of construction, Lake of the Ozarks was the largest man-made lake in the United States and one of the largest in the world. It was created to provide hydroelectric power for customers of Union Electric, but it quickly became a significant tourist destination. Most of its shoreline is privately owned, unlike many flood-control lakes in the region that were constructed by the U.S. Army Corps of Engineers. The relatively stable surface elevation has created conditions suitable for private development within a few feet of the shoreline. Over 70,000 homes are along the lake, many of which are vacation homes. The lake is now a major resort area, and more than 5 million people visit annually.

In 2011, the Federal Energy Regulatory Commission (FERC) renewed the lease for the power plant operated by Ameren Missouri. In the process, the FERC determined that numerous homes and structures were encroaching on utility land in violation of federal regulations. According to the Boston Globe, this issue "has triggered panic in the area's lakefront communities and led to a growing battle among regulators, a utility company, land attorneys, and the state's congressional delegation."

In 2015, FERC issued an order allowing Ameren Missouri to pursue permits for about 215 structures that were termed as "nonconforming." Those were the structures remaining in limbo after Ameren was given approval to redraw the project lines encompassing Lake of the Ozarks.

Recently, the lake has been impacted by several extreme weather events. In 2019, the lake was hit by the floods. In 2021, the lake froze over during a cold wave, the first time the lake had frozen over in 20 years, according to Ameren Missouri. In 2022, the lake levels were low due to a drought.

Geography
It lies in central Missouri on the Salem Plateau of the Ozarks. The lake extends across four Missouri counties, from Benton County in the west through Camden and Morgan Counties to Miller County in the east.

The reservoir is impounded at its northeastern end by Bagnell Dam, and the Osage River is both its primary inflow and outflow. Long and winding in shape, the lake consists of the main,  Osage River channel and several arms, each fed by a different tributary. The southwestern arm is fed by the Niangua and Little Niangua rivers, the southeastern arm by Grandglaize Creek, and the northern arm by several streams including Gravois, Indian, and Little Gravois creeks. Many smaller tributaries also drain into the lake, creating numerous small coves and indentations in its shore.

U.S. Route 54 runs east–west across the reservoir's southwestern arm and then generally northeast–southwest along its eastern shoreline, crossing the southeastern arm at Osage Beach and crosses the Grand Glaize Bridge. Missouri Route 5 runs generally north–south along the lake's western shoreline, crossing the main channel at Hurricane Deck. Missouri Route 7 runs generally northwest–southeast to the lake's southwest, crossing the southwestern arm. Missouri Route 134 runs southeast from U.S. 54 north of Osage Beach to its southern terminus in Lake of the Ozarks State Park. Route 42 connects to Route 134 and US 54 in Osage Beach. Route 242 connects US 54 to near Village of Four Seasons. In addition, a network of supplemental state routes provides access to various points along the lake shore.

Numerous settlements are located near or on the Lake of the Ozarks. With a population of 4,570, the largest city is Osage Beach, which sits where the lake's southeastern arm joins the main channel. The second-largest is the city of Camdenton, located a few miles east of the southwestern arm. Lake Ozark lies immediately north of Osage Beach and just south of Bagnell Dam. Other, smaller communities along or near the lake include (from east to west): Kaiser, Lakeside, Linn Creek, Village of Four Seasons, Rocky Mount, Sunrise Beach, Hurricane Deck, Gravois Mills, Laurie, and Lakeview Heights.

Hydrography
As it was constructed for power generation, not flood control, the lake has only limited flood-control capacity.

Due to its large volume and surface area, various sources identify the Lake of the Ozarks as either the largest reservoir in Missouri or the second-largest after Truman Reservoir.

Infrastructure

Bridges and dams 
A large number of bridges had been constructed for efficient crossing of the lake. Niangua Bridge, built in 1936, was replaced by a girder bridge in 2003. The Niangua Arm US 54 Bridge, built in 1931. was replaced by a girder bridge in 1999.

Hurricane Deck Bridge 

The Hurricane Deck Bridge is a delta-frame bridge located in the west side of Lake of the Ozarks. The bridge was originally constructed in 1934 as a truss-arch bridge, but this bridge was replaced in 2013. The first bridge's structure was similar to the structure of the I-35W Mississippi River bridge, which had collapsed six years before the bridge was destroyed. After the replacement opened in 2013, the original bridge was destroyed.

Grand Glaize Bridge 

Originally built in 1930, the bridge crosses the Grand Glaize Arm of the lake in Osage Beach, Missouri. It carries U.S. Route 54 and connects Osage Beach to Camdenton. Originally, one girder bridge carried both directions of traffic; a second girder bridge was constructed in 1984, enabling traffic to pass over the lake in both directions using separate bridges. It has undergone a significant number of improvements since its original construction, and now supports three lanes of traffic in both directions.

Bagnell Dam 

Originally constructed in 1931, Bagnell Dam is the only major dam supporting Lake of the Ozarks. Located in Miller County near Camden County, the dam is 2,543 ft (775 m) long and 148 ft (48 m) tall. The dam was originally constructed by the Union Electric Company (now Ameren) to provide hydroelectric power to the nearby Osage Powerplant (located near the base of the dam) and support two-way traffic on a narrow highway above the dam (Bagnell Dam Boulevard). Since its original construction, the dam has undergone a number of significant infrastructure upgrades throughout the 2010s. The dam has 12 floodgates, which fully open when the lake floods. In 2019, the floodgates were open due to the Lake of the Ozarks being hit by the flooding.

Lake of the Ozarks Community Bridge 

The Lake of the Ozarks Community Bridge is a continuous truss bridge in Lake Ozark. Built in 1998, it is one of the newest bridges in the Lake of the Ozarks area, primarily built to connect the east (towards Lake Ozark and Osage Beach) and west sides (towards Sunrise Beach and Camdenton) of Lake of the Ozarks. Furthermore, the bridge is the only toll bridge in the Lake of the Ozarks area, with a toll that varies between seasons. The bridge is expected to be toll-free by 2026.

Management

Bagnell Dam is operated and maintained by Ameren Missouri, the successor of Union Electric, under the authority of a permit issued by the FERC. Ameren Missouri is also responsible for managing both the shoreline and water levels of the lake. All land surrounding the lake that is within the project boundary defined by the FERC is under the company's jurisdiction. Any improvements to the shoreline, including docks, seawalls, and other structures, require permission from Ameren Missouri prior to construction.

Tourism and recreation

During the process of land acquisition for the lake during the 1920s,  of land were set aside for a national park along the Grand Glaize Arm of the lake. In 1946, this land was acquired by the State of Missouri for Lake of the Ozarks State Park, the largest state park in Missouri. Another state park on the shores of the lake is Ha Ha Tonka State Park on the Niangua Arm of the lake.

Lake of the Ozarks State Park is home to Party Cove, a gathering spot that a The New York Times writer called the "oldest established permanent floating bacchanal in the country." The Missouri State Water Patrol has estimated that the cove attracts up to 3,000 boats during the Fourth of July weekend.

During the 2020 COVID-19 pandemic, the Lake of the Ozarks gained notoriety when on Memorial Day (May 25, 2020) a large crowd congregated at the lake.

On April 1, 2012, biologist and TV personality Jeremy Wade visited the lake and filmed an episode on the large catfish that could be caught there.

In 2021, Osage Casino management announced it planned build in the Lake of the Ozarks area. Construction had not begun in April 2022, but demolition of the former Quality Inn was completed where the casino will be located.

Events 

AquaPolooza takes place each July. Attendees gather on rafts and inflatable tubes. Live music is usually played from noon to 5 pm as boaters link up their boats to one another.

At the end of every summer, the Lake of the Ozarks holds an event called "the Shootout". It is the biggest powerboat racing event of the year at the lake and runs over a three-mile course.

On the last Saturday of February of every year, the Lake of the Ozarks holds a polar bear plunge event as a fundraiser for Special Olympics in Missouri.

In popular media
The TV series Ozark is set in Osage Beach, though filmed in Georgia. In November 2017, it was reported that the series helped increase tourism and notoriety of the Lake of the Ozarks, but did not have a significant economic impact. In February 2018, a real-life restaurant called Marty Byrde's, inspired by the series, was opened in Lake Ozark, Missouri, and includes menu items based on the show, including Ruth's Smoked Wings.

References

External links

Lake of the Ozarks, Ameren Missouri
 Lake of the Ozarks, Lake of the Ozarks Convention & Visitor Bureau
Ha Ha Tonka State Park, Missouri Department of Natural Resources
Lake of the Ozarks State Park, Missouri Department of Natural Resources
Lake of the Ozarks Discord Chat, Lake of the Ozarks Discord Chat
 Lake of the Ozarks bridges, bridge hunter

 
Ozarks
Bodies of water of the Ozarks
Ozarks
Protected areas of Benton County, Missouri
Protected areas of Camden County, Missouri
Protected areas of Miller County, Missouri
Buildings and structures in Morgan County, Missouri
Buildings and structures in Benton County, Missouri
Buildings and structures in Camden County, Missouri
Buildings and structures in Miller County, Missouri
Protected areas of Morgan County, Missouri
Bodies of water of Benton County, Missouri
Bodies of water of Camden County, Missouri
Bodies of water of Miller County, Missouri
Bodies of water of Morgan County, Missouri
1931 establishments in Missouri